Panayiotis Spyrou() born October 17, 1976 in Nicosia, Cyprus is a Cypriot football defender who last played for Anagennisi Dherynia. His former teams are Alki Larnaca, Olympiakos Nicosia, APOEL and Enosis Neon Paralimni where he spent most of his playing years.

External links
 

Living people
1976 births
Cypriot footballers
Cyprus international footballers
Association football defenders
Cypriot First Division players
Alki Larnaca FC players
APOEL FC players
Olympiakos Nicosia players
Enosis Neon Paralimni FC players
Anagennisi Deryneia FC players
Sportspeople from Nicosia